Slippery When Wet: The Videos is a VHS release featuring all the videos from Bon Jovi's breakthrough third album, Slippery When Wet, together with interviews and backstage footage.

Track listing
 "Wild in the Streets"
 "Livin' on a Prayer" (Live at MTV Awards 1987)
 "You Give Love a Bad Name"
 "Never Say Goodbye"
 "Livin' on a Prayer"
 "Wanted Dead or Alive"

Certifications

References 

Bon Jovi video albums
1987 video albums
Music video compilation albums
1987 compilation albums